Virginia's 13th Senate district is one of 40 districts in the Senate of Virginia. It has been represented by Democrat John Bell since 2020, succeeding retiring Republican Dick Black.

Geography
District 13 covers parts of Loudoun and Prince William Counties in Northern Virginia, including some or all of Purcellville, Ashburn, Broadlands, South Riding, Gainesville, and Linton Hall.

The district overlaps with Virginia's 1st and 10th congressional districts, and with the 10th, 13th, 32nd, 33rd, 40th, 50th, 67th, and 87th districts of the Virginia House of Delegates. It borders the states of Maryland and West Virginia.

Recent election results

2019

2015

2011

Federal and statewide results in District 13

Historical results
All election results below took place prior to 2011 redistricting, and thus were under different district lines. Before the 2010 census, District 13 was located in the Hampton Roads metropolitan area. Before the 1960 census, the district was in Virginia's southwestern corner.

2007

2003

1999

1995

References

Virginia Senate districts
Government in Loudoun County, Virginia
Prince William County, Virginia